The Revolutionary Party of the Workers of Bolivia (PRTB) was a political party in Bolivia, formed in 1972 as the political wing of the National Liberation Army (ELN). PRTB was later move away from the foquismo line of ELN. PRTB published El proletario.

Electoral alliances
In 1978, PRTB formed part of the Revolutionary Left Front. In the July 1979 elections, PRTB supported the Popular and Democratic Union.

References

Communist parties in Bolivia